Weaver Shipyards, also called Weaver Brothers Shipyards was a shipyard in Orange, Texas on the Sabine River. The shipyard opened in 1897. The shipyard was founded by Joe Weaver and his son as Joseph Weaver and Son Shipyard. Joe Weaver was L.E. Weaver, known as Ed Weaver.  In 1898 Levingston Shipbuilding Company founder, George Levingston purchased major shares of Joseph Weaver and Son Shipyard.  Weaver Shipyard's early work was the construction work for Galveston Navigation District building barges.  The yard was also active in building and repairing tugboats.  In 1930 Joseph Weaver died and a new family partnership was made, L.E. Weaver and his son. Ed Weaver's son was L.A. Weaver. In 1941 Ed Weaver died and L.A. Weaver changed the shipyard to Weaver Shipyards. Weaver Shipyards became a partnership of several a Weaver family members.

During World War II there was a great demand for shipbuilding under the Emergency Shipbuilding Program. Weaver Shipyards built for the United States Navy wooden minesweepers and two wooden Submarine chasers. United States Naval Station Orange was the overseer of the projects. The minesweepers were made of wood as wood did not attract Nazi Germany magnetic mines. YMS 66 launched on January 31, 1942, was Weaver Shipyards first minesweeper. YMS 66 was YMS-1-class auxiliary motor minesweeper:  After the war there was a surplus of ships and new building was slow. The yard continued in repair and upgrade work. Weaver Shipyards built small wood and steel shrimp boats. Weaver Shipyard operations were sold in 1975, with but Weaver still owned the land and leases the land.

Ships
Built at shipyard:

World War II
Minesweeper
YMS 66
YMS-67 Launched 17 Feb 1942 
YMS-68 Launched 24 February 1942
YMS 69
YMS 70
YMS-71 Launched	26 Mar 1942 
YMS-72  Launched 9 April 1942 
YMS-75, Launched 26 May 1942  
YMS 247
YMS 248
YMS 249
YMS 250
YMS 251
YMS 252
YMS 253 
YMS 254
YMS 255  mined near Boulogne and sank in 1944.
YMS 256
YMS 257
YMS 258
YMS 371
YMS 372
YMS-373
YMS 374
Sub Chaser
SC 666 	
SC 667 

Post war:

MGI-F1	Tank Barge	1949
Motley	Towboat	1951
Don Enrique	Fishing Vessel	1953
Collins 5	Tank Barge	1955
Sea Raven	Research Vessel	1956
Donald Stevenson	Tug	1956
YNG 45	Gate Tender	1960
YNG 46	Gate Tender	1960
YNG 47	Gate Tender	1960
Lady Fran	Fishing Vessel	1962
Off. No. 1	Tank Barge	1969
Houston Pilot No. 3	Pilot Boat	1970
King's Squire	Tug 	1972
Bill Stapp	Towboat 	1975
Special T	Deck Barge	1980
Apex Chicago	Oil Recovery	1981
Little Joe	Towboat	1981

See also
 Wooden boats of World War II

External links
youtube.com, World War II Shipyards: Orange, Texas

References

1897 establishments in Texas